Gösta Lundell (born 14 October 1934) is a Swedish former footballer who played as a midfielder, best known for representing Hammarby IF.

A full international between 1962 and 1963, he won 7 caps for the Sweden national team.

Club career
Lundell was born in Stockholm and started to play football with local club IF Ulvarna in the Swedish lower divisions.

On 14 May 1955, Lundell made his senior debut for Hammarby IF in Allsvenskan, Sweden's top tier, scoring one goal in a 2–5 home loss against GAIS.

He broke into the side as a regular starter in 1957, in a season where Hammarby got relegated to Division 2, and soon became known as a technically gifted playmaker in the midfield position.

In 1957–58, Lundell helped the club to win a promotion back to Allsvenskan; the team scored an impressive 117 goals in 33 fixtures throughout the season. He played a major part in establishing Hammarby in the top tier during the next four seasons.

Lundell decided to retire from football due to injuries at the end of 1965, aged 31, playing his last game for Hammarby on 24 October in a 2–4 home loss against IFK Norrköping. In total, he made 167 league appearances for the club, scoring 3 goals.

International career
In 1962, Lundell was called up to the Swedish national team for the first time together with teammate Tom Turesson, by the former Hammarby-coach Lennart Nyman who had been appointed manager of the national team the same year.

He won 7 caps for his country in total, with the only competitive appearance coming on 21 June 1962 in a 2–0 away win against Norway in a European Nations' Cup qualifier.

Other sports
In 1956, Lundell played bandy for one season with Hammarby IF.

References

External links

1934 births
Living people
Footballers from Stockholm
Swedish footballers
Association football midfielders
Allsvenskan players
Hammarby Fotboll players
Sweden international footballers
Swedish bandy players
Hammarby IF Bandy players